Bagas Satrio Nugroho (born 26 February 2001) is an Indonesian professional footballer who plays as a midfielder for Liga 1 club Persik Kediri.

Club career

Persik Kediri
He was signed for Persik Kediri to play in Liga 1 in the 2021 season. Bagas made his first-team debut on 23 February 2022 as a substitute in a match against Persiraja Banda Aceh at the Ngurah Rai Stadium, Denpasar.

Career statistics

Club

Notes

References

External links
 Bagas Satrio at Soccerway
 Bagas Satrio at Liga Indonesia

2001 births
Living people
Indonesian footballers
Liga 1 (Indonesia) players
Persik Kediri players
Association football midfielders
People from Kediri (city)
Sportspeople from East Java